55th Airborne Brigade of Shiraz is an airborne separate brigade of Ground Forces of Islamic Republic of Iran Army based in Shiraz, Fars Province. It was engaged in the Iran-Iraq War.

References 

Military units and formations of Ground Forces of Islamic Republic of Iran Army
Airborne infantry brigades
Shiraz
Parachuting in Iran
Airborne units and formations of Iran